Sedrick is a given name. Notable people with the given name include:

Sedrick Curry (born 1976), American football player
Sedrick Ellis (born 1985), American football player
Sedrick Hodge (born 1978), American football player
Sedrick Huckaby (born 1975), American artist
Sedrick Irvin (born 1978), American football player
Sedrick Shaw (born 1973), American football player